Ivan planina (lit. Ivan Mountain) is a mountain near Hadžići, Konjic and Kreševo, in central Bosnia and Herzegovina. Ivan Mountain is part of Dinaric Alps.

See also
List of mountains in Bosnia and Herzegovina

References

Mountains of Bosnia and Herzegovina
Mountains of the Federation of Bosnia and Herzegovina
Konjic